Brian Cormac O'Neill (born September 15, 1995) is an American football offensive tackle for the Minnesota Vikings of the National Football League (NFL). He played college football at Pittsburgh.

Early years
O'Neill attended Salesianum School in Wilmington, Delaware. Along with football, he also played basketball and lacrosse. Offensively as a senior he caught 33 passes for 614 yards and eight touchdowns. Defensively, he tallied 45 tackles, five sacks, 13 pass deflections, three forced fumbles and two fumble recoveries. A 3-star recruit, he committed to play football for Pittsburgh as a tight end in July 2013 over offers from Coastal Carolina, Old Dominion, and Tulane, among other offers.

College career
O'Neill redshirted as a true freshman in 2014.

O'Neill switched from tight end to offensive tackle in July 2015. Minus the first game of the 2015 season, O'Neill started every game for Pittsburgh from 2015-2017 (37 consecutive starts). In 2016 he was named to the All-ACC Third-team and in 2017 the All-ACC First-team. After 2017, his redshirt junior season, he declared for the 2018 NFL Draft.

Professional career
O'Neill had an impressive performance at the 2018 NFL Combine. He ran the 40-yard dash in 4.82 seconds, the fastest time among all offensive linemen and the best time for a lineman since 2013. It also was the fourth-fastest recorded time for an offensive lineman at the combine since 2006, trailing only Eagles' Lane Johnson (4.72), Saints' Terron Armstead (4.71) and Vikings teammate Aviante Collins (4.77). He also had the best time among offensive linemen in the three-cone drill, at 7.14 seconds.

O'Neill was drafted by the Minnesota Vikings in the second round (62nd overall) of the 2018 NFL Draft. He entered the season as a backup tackle behind starters Riley Reiff and Rashod Hill. He made his first career start in Week 6 at right tackle after Rashod Hill was moved to left tackle in place of an injured Riley Reiff. He maintained that starting role the rest of the season over Hill after Reiff returned from injury to play left tackle.

On September 8, 2021, O'Neill signed a five-year, $92.5 million contract extension with the Vikings.

Following the 2021 season, O'Neill was named to the 2022 Pro Bowl, his first.

On January 3, 2023, O'Neill was placed on injured reserve.

Personal life
O'Neill's father, Brendan, played football at Dartmouth and his mother, Elizabeth, swam at Northeastern.  His older brother, Eamon O’Neill, was a two time Delaware player of the year for the Salesianum School soccer team. He went on to star at Northwestern. His uncle is Delaware Governor John Carney, who also played football at Dartmouth.

References

External links
Pittsburgh bio
Minnesota Vikings bio

1995 births
Living people
Players of American football from Wilmington, Delaware
American football offensive tackles
Pittsburgh Panthers football players
Minnesota Vikings players
Salesianum School alumni
National Conference Pro Bowl players